Henry Cavendish (1731–1810)  was a British scientist who discovered hydrogen.

Henry Cavendish may also refer to:
 Sir Henry Cvendish (1550–1616), MP for Derbyshire and libertine
 Henry Cavendish, 2nd Duke of Newcastle (1630–1691), earlier styled Viscount Mansfield
 Henry Cavendish, Earl of Ogle (1659–1680), British aristocrat
 Lord Henry Cavendish (1673–1700), MP for Derby 1695–1700
 Sir Henry Cavendish, 1st Baronet (1707–1776), British politician
 Sir Henry Cavendish, 2nd Baronet (1732–1804), Irish politician, also MP for Lostwithiel 1768–74
 Henry Cavendish (British Army officer) (1789–1873), courtier, earlier MP for Derby 1812–35
 Henry Cavendish, 3rd Baron Waterpark (1793–1863), Whig MP for Knaresborough, Derbyshire South, and Lichfield
 Lord Henry Cavendish-Bentinck (1863–1931), MP for Norfolk North-West and Nottingham South
 Henry Anson Cavendish, 4th Baron Waterpark (1839–1912), British aristocrat and sportsman

See also
 Lord George Cavendish (1810–1880) (George Henry Cavendish), MP for North Derbyshire 1834–80
 George Henry Compton Cavendish (1784–1809), MP for Aylesbury 1806–09